Bethóc ingen Maíl Coluim meic Cináeda was the elder daughter of Máel Coluim mac Cináeda, King of Scots, and the mother of his successor, Duncan I.

Biography
Bethóc was the eldest daughter and heir of Malcolm II of Scotland, who had no known sons. She married Crínán, Abbot of Dunkeld, about 1000. Together they had an heir, Donnchad I. Crínán has also been assigned other children, that may have been by Bethóc: Maldred, Lord of Allerdale, married Ealdgyth, daughter of Uhtred the Bold, and ancestor of the Earls of Dunbar; and a daughter (name not known) mother of Moddan, Earl of Caithness.

Their heir Duncan, also known as Donnchad, succeeded his grandfather Malcolm II to become King of Alba in 1034.

Bethóc had 2 younger sisters: Donada, who married Findláech mac Ruaidrí, Mormaer of Moray, and was the mother of Macbeth and Olith, who married Sigurd Hlodvirsson, Earl of Orkney. and was the mother of Thorfinn the Mighty. Early writers have asserted that Máel Coluim also designated Donnchad as his successor under the rules of tanistry because there were other possible claimants to the throne.

References

Sources
Anderson, Marjorie Ogilvy. Kings and Kingship in Early Scotland, 1973 

10th-century births
11th-century deaths
House of Dunkeld
11th-century Scottish women
11th-century Scottish people
Scottish princesses
Gaels
Daughters of kings